Road 88 is a road located completely in Kerman Province connecting Sirjan to Baft and Jiroft.

References

External links 

 Iran road map on Young Journalists Club

Roads in Iran